Mount Jamieson Resort (formerly known as Kamiskotia Snow Resort) is an alpine ski resort located at Mount Jamieson, an extinct volcano, in Ontario, Canada. It offers skiing, snowboarding, snowmobiling and tubing along with lessons.

References

Economy of Timmins